Stanley Watson (17 March 1937 – 16 January 2014) was an English footballer who made 27 appearances in the Football League playing as a wing half or centre half for Darlington in the 1950s. He made his debut playing at centre half on 8 February 1958 away to Workington, in a team weakened when heavy snow prevented some players from reaching the ground.

Watson was married to British 400m runner Joy Grieveson.

References

1937 births
2014 deaths
Footballers from Darlington
English footballers
Association football wing halves
Darlington F.C. players
English Football League players